George Whitney (birth unknown – death unknown) was a Welsh professional rugby league footballer who played in the 1920s.

International honours
George Whitney won caps for Wales while at Salford 1921 2-caps.

Note
The Welsh footballer named H. Whitney who won a cap for Other Nationalities while at Salford in 1921, this is believed to be; George Whitney.

References

Batley Bulldogs players
Other Nationalities rugby league team players
Place of birth missing
Place of death missing
Rugby league locks
Salford Red Devils players
Wales national rugby league team players
Welsh rugby league players
Year of birth missing
Year of death missing